Wayne Memorial Hospital is a 114-bed not-for-profit hospital located in Honesdale, Pennsylvania. Its patients include residents of Wayne, Pike, and Lackawanna County, Pennsylvania as well as Sullivan County, New York. Wayne Memorial first opened in 1920. The hospital is a Medicare Dependent Hospital.

In 2016, several new services, including a helipad and a cardiac catheterization lab, were added to the hospital. On October 3, 2017, it was announced that the hospital was granted Adult Level IV trauma center accreditation by the Pennsylvania Trauma Systems Foundation, effective November 1, 2017.

References

External links
 Wayne Memorial Hospital website
 Greater Honesdale Partnership website

Honesdale, Pennsylvania
Buildings and structures in Wayne County, Pennsylvania
Hospitals in Pennsylvania
Hospital buildings completed in 1920
1920 establishments in Pennsylvania